Nature Nurture is the second studio album by British alternative rock band Dinosaur Pile-Up. The album was released on 17 June 2013 and 25 February 2014 in the United Kingdom and the United States, respectively. The album failed to chart in either of those countries. However, the band's newfound popularity in Japan, along with the release of the Peninsula EP by A-Sketch months prior to the album's 22 October 2014 release, saw it chart at #168 in the country. The single "Arizona Waiting" reached #68 on the Billboard Japan Radio Songs chart shortly after the album's release. A-Sketch also released two "Japan Limited" music videos, both consisting of live performance footage, for "Peninsula" and "Arizona Waiting."

The song "Peninsula" was the most played song on SiriusXM's Alt Nation channel for the week ending 27 February 2014.

The song "Draw A Line" was featured in the fifth episode of season 14 of Degrassi, in the scene where Eli punches Drew in the face.

Critical reception 

Nature Nurture has received mostly positive. Metacritic, which assigns a normalized rating out of 100 to reviews from critics, gave the album an average score of 68, which indicates "generally positive reviews".

Track listing

Notes

References 

Dinosaur Pile-Up albums
2013 albums